Covington may refer to:

People 
 Covington (surname)

Places

United Kingdom
 Covington, Cambridgeshire
 Covington, South Lanarkshire

United States
 Covington, Georgia
 Covington, Indiana
 Covington, Kentucky, the largest American city named Covington
 Covington, Louisiana
 Covington, Michigan
 Covington, Missouri
 Covington, Nebraska
 Covington, New York
 Covington, Ohio
 Covington, Oklahoma
 Covington, Tennessee
 Covington, Texas
 Covington, Virginia
 Covington, Washington
 Fort Covington, New York
 Port Covington, a former cargo terminal in Baltimore, Maryland

Navy vessels 
 USS Covington (1863), a side-wheel steamer, purchased by the Union during the American Civil War
 USS Covington (ID-1409), a troop transport ship sunk by German U86 in 1918, World War I
 USS Covington (PF-56), a Tacoma class frigate built during World War II

Other 
 5424 Covington (1983 TN1), a Main-belt Asteroid
 Camp Covington, Guam
 Covington Highway, in metropolitan Atlanta, Georgia
 Covington River, in Virginia
 Covington and Ohio Railroad, part of a planned railroad link between eastern Virginia and the Ohio River
 Covington & Burling, a prominent law firm

See also 
 Covington County (disambiguation)
 Covington Township (disambiguation)
 Covington High School (disambiguation)
 Covington Municipal Airport (disambiguation)
 Corvington, a surname with similar spelling